RJ Liebenberg (born 11 December 1990 in Bethlehem) is a South African rugby union player who most recently played for . His regular position is eighth man or flanker.

Career

Youth and Varsity Cup rugby
He represented them at the Under–16 Grant Khomo Week in 2006, as well as the Under–18 Craven Week tournaments in 2007 and 2008 before playing for the  side in the 2008 Under-19 Provincial Championship competition.

He also played for university side  in the 2012 and 2013 Varsity Cup competitions.

Golden Lions
His first class debut for the  came in a compulsory friendly match against the  prior to the 2011 Currie Cup Premier Division, which turned out to be his only appearance for the team.

Griquas
His performances in the 2013 Varsity Cup resulted in him being called into the  squad for the 2013 Currie Cup Premier Division.

References

South African rugby union players
Living people
1990 births
People from Bethlehem, Free State
Golden Lions players
Griquas (rugby union) players
Rugby union flankers
Rugby union players from the Free State (province)